The 2020 NCAA Division I men's soccer season was the 62nd season of NCAA championship men's college soccer. The season was originally slated to begin on August 28, 2020 and conclude on November 15, 2020. The season was to culminate with the 2020 NCAA Division I Men's Soccer Tournament, which was to be held from November 18 to December 13, 2020, with the four-team College Cup at Meredith Field at Harder Stadium in Santa Barbara, California.

On August 13, 2020, the NCAA Tournament was suspended due to the ongoing COVID-19 pandemic. Leading up to the postseason tournament suspension, some conferences had planned to play conference-only matches during the fall season, while some conferences opted to postpone the season to Spring 2021 (February to May 2021). Ultimately, the Atlantic Coast Conference and the Sun Belt Conference began play for the 2020 fall season; while a handful of programs scheduled competitive fixtures for the fall 2020 season: Army, Kentucky, Mercer, Navy, South Carolina, and UAB.

On September 16, 2020 the NCAA announced that the spring season would run from February 3 to April 17, 2021, culminating with the NCAA Tournament, which was reduced from 48 to 36 teams for this season only. The postponed NCAA Tournament began on April 30 and ended on May 17, 2021. The ACC and Sun Belt champions, which were determined in November, earned automatic bids into the tournament. Nevertheless, the fall season began with Notre Dame beating Kentucky, 1–0, on September 17, 2020.

On March 24, 2021, the NCAA announced that the entirety of the men's and women's tournament would be consolidated, with all 36 men's teams and 48 women's teams playing all games in Cary, North Carolina and its vicinity during the period from April 27–May 17.

Changes from 2019

Coaching changes

New programs 
On November 27, 2017, it was announced that, in 2020, the Tritons of the University of California, San Diego, located in the San Diego, California district of La Jolla, would begin the transition from Division II to Division I as a member of the Big West Conference.

On January 11, 2019, it was announced that the Trailblazers of Dixie State University, now known as Utah Tech University, of St. George, Utah would begin the transition from Division II to Division I as a member of the Western Athletic Conference (WAC).

On June 17, 2019, it was announced that the Knights of Bellarmine University of Louisville, Kentucky would begin the transition from Division II to Division I as a member of the ASUN Conference.

Chicago State University announced on June 23, 2020 that it would begin men's soccer effective immediately. The school had first committed to adding the sport when joining the Western Athletic Conference in 2014, and it budgeted for a team in 2016, but the school did not then begin play due to financial challenges and seriously discussed leaving Division I. The decision to finally add men's soccer came at the same time the school dropped baseball due to fallout from the COVID-19 pandemic. The Cougars will play in their full-time home of the WAC  but will not begin conference play until 2021.

On July 15, 2020, after months of consideration, the NCAA granted the highly unusual request of the University of St. Thomas to move directly from Division III to Division I. The school had already accepted an invitation to join the Summit League, and the Tommies will enter Division I and Summit League competition in 2021.

Discontinued programs 
On November 20, 2019, Valparaiso announced that the men's soccer and tennis teams would be eliminated to allow greater attention to the school's other sports teams.

On April 14, 2020, Cincinnati announced that, due to uncertainty surrounding the COVID-19 pandemic, the men's soccer program would be discontinued effective immediately.

On May 26, 2020, Appalachian State, a Division I men's soccer power in the late 1970s, cut the men's soccer program and two other men's programs in response to the financial impact of COVID-19.

Conference realignment

Other changes 
In June 2020, the Missouri Valley Conference and SIU Edwardsville jointly announced that SIUE men's soccer would leave the Mid-American Conference and return to the MVC effective with the 2021 season. While restoring the MVC to six teams, the move then reduced the MAC to only five teams.

The Sun Belt Conference had begun the 2020–21 school year with five men's soccer members, but by the start of the spring 2021 season, two were confirmed to be departing that July for conferences that sponsor men's soccer. On July 6, 2020, Howard announced that it would become an associate member of the Northeast Conference (NEC) in six sports no later than July 2021. Two sports joined the NEC for the 2020–21 school year, while the remaining four, including men's soccer, will join in July 2021. Then, on January 29, 2021, the ASUN Conference officially announced three schools as incoming full members, including Sun Belt men's soccer associate member Central Arkansas. With the Sun Belt men's soccer league by that time all but certain to disband after the 2020–21 school year, Conference USA (C-USA) and Coastal Carolina jointly announced on February 25 that the Chanticleers would become men's soccer members of the league effective with the fall 2021 season. The end of Sun Belt men's soccer was confirmed on May 21 when the Mid-American Conference announced that the last two Sun Belt men's soccer members, Georgia Southern and Georgia State, would join the MAC for the fall 2021 season. This move also restored the MAC men's soccer league to seven teams.

Season outlook

Preseason polls 
NOTE: College Soccer News released its pre-season poll before the NCAA moved the season to the Spring semester. The ACC and the Sun Belt and some other teams played son Fall games, and the Ivy League cancelled its season. Before the Spring season got underway, College Soccer News conducted a new poll and published a new Top 30. The new poll is to the right of the older one.

Impact of COVID-19 on season 

For the 2020 season, several changes in how the season began, and how conference play was organized affected the 2020 season.

 The Atlantic 10 Men's Soccer Tournament, for the 2020 season only, will be reduced from eight teams to four, to minimize travel and contamination.
 The Big East Conference divided into two divisions, the "East" and "Midwest" divisions to minimize travel and to regionalize conference play.
 The Big South Conference Men's Soccer Tournament, for the 2020 season only, will be reduced from six teams to four, to minimize travel and contamination.
 The Metro Atlantic Athletic Conference announced that the men's soccer season will begin on September 11, rather than August 28.
 The Mid-American Conference discontinued its men's soccer tournament. All teams will play each other home-and-home.
 The Southern Conference Men's Soccer Tournament, for the 2020 season only, will be reduced from six teams to four, to minimize travel and contamination.
 On July 8, the Ivy League cancelled all intercollegiate sports for the 2020 Fall semester; this includes both men's and women's soccer.
 On July 10, the Big Ten and Pac-12 Conferences announced all teams will play the 2020 season with conference-only matches
 On July 13, the Patriot League announced that all fall sports, including men's soccer would be cancelled.
 On July 17, the Atlantic 10 Conference announced that all fall sports, including men's soccer, would be postponed to spring 2021.
 On August 13, the Western Athletic Conference  announced that all fall sports, including men's soccer, would be postponed to spring 2021. However, the league is allowing nonconference games.	
 On August 13, the Southern Conference  announced that conference competition in all fall sports, including men's soccer, would be suspended through the end of the calendar year.
 On August 14, the ASUN Conference  announced that all fall sports, including men's soccer, would be postponed with the intent to hold them in the spring 2021.
 On August 15, the NCAA suspended the men's soccer championship for the fall season, with the possibility of being played in winter or spring 2021
 On August 27, three conferences confirmed to play in the fall, with individual programs allowed to play games in the fall. The ACC and the Sun Belt played in fall 2020.
 On October 15, the ASUN announced that it would split into North and South Divisions for the spring 2021 season only. Conference standings, and with them seeding in the conference tournament, were based exclusively on results within each division.

Fall 2020 season

Standings

Rankings

Top-ranked team

Top Drawer Soccer Team of the Week 
 Bold denotes TDS player of the week.

Major upsets 
In this list, a "major upset" is defined as a game won by an unranked team that defeats a ranked team.

All rankings are from the United Soccer Coaches Poll.

Fall postseason

Conference winners and tournaments

Spring 2021 season

Standings 
Note: W-L-T records are through the Finals of the NCAA Tournament.

Rankings

Top-ranked team

Top Drawer Soccer Team of the Week 
 Bold denotes TDS player of the week.

Spring postseason

Conference winners and tournaments

Postseason awards

Hermann Trophy 

The Hermann Trophy is given to the year's most outstanding player. The finalists were announced on May 21. On May 27, 2021, Gloire Amanda of Oregon State won the Hermann Trophy.

 Glorie Amanda – Oregon State
 Victor Bezerra – Indiana
 Valentin Noël – Pitt

TDS National Player of the Year 

The TopDrawerSoccer.com National Player of the Year Award recognizes the top college soccer player in the nation by the TDS staff. On May 25, 2021, Veljko Petkovic of Pitt won the award.
 Veljko Petković – Pitt

Senior CLASS Award 

 The Senior CLASS Award is presented each year to the most outstanding senior in NCAA Division I. Thomas M'Barek of Cleveland State won the award. The following finalists were:
 Jacob Graiber (DF), UIC
 Justin Malou (DF), Clemson
 Thomas M'Barek (DF), Cleveland State
 Jacob Montes (MF), Georgetown
 Yannik Oettl (GK), UCF
 George Proctor (DF), Georgia State
 Tor Saunders (GK), Coastal Carolina
 Chris Sullivan (MF), Bowling Green
Joel Walker (FW), Oregon State
Marc Ybarra (MF), Michigan

All-Americans

Conference player and coaches of the year

Other major awards 
 United Soccer Coaches College Coach of the Year: Chris Grassie, Marshall
 Bill Jeffrey Award:
 Glenn Myernick Award:
 Jerry Yeagley Award: Raymon Gaddis
 Mike Berticelli Award: Neil Hull
 NCAA Division I Men's Soccer Tournament Most Outstanding Player:
 Offensive: Jamil Roberts, Marshall
 Defensive: Roman Celentano, Indiana
 TopDrawerSoccer.com National Freshman of the Year Award: Bertin Jacquesson, Pitt

Final rankings

Statistics

Individual statistics 

 Individual statistics are through the games of April 17, 2021

See also 
 College soccer
 List of NCAA Division I men's soccer programs
 2020 in American soccer
 2020 NCAA Division I Men's Soccer Tournament
 2020 NCAA Division I women's soccer season

References

 
NCAA
NCAA
NCAA Division I men's soccer season